Lego Indiana Jones: The Original Adventures is a Lego-themed action-adventure video game developed by Traveller's Tales and published by LucasArts. The game allows players to recreate moments from the first three Indiana Jones films: Raiders of the Lost Ark (1981), Indiana Jones and the Temple of Doom (1984), and Indiana Jones and the Last Crusade (1989). It features the same cooperative play mode as seen in the Lego Star Wars video games, although it is restricted to local console play. The game was released on 3 June 2008 in the United States and Canada and 6 June in Europe. This game is based on the Lego Indiana Jones toy line. The Mac OS X version of the game was released on 4 December by Feral Interactive.

As introduced in Lego Star Wars: The Complete Saga, new moves include clinging onto branches during a jump using Indy's whip. As a promotion, Lego Star Wars: The Complete Saga features Indiana Jones as an unlockable playable character.

The game follows the events in the films, although some scenes from the film have been altered to allow for cooperative multiplayer play, to become more family-friendly, or just provide comic relief to the player.

Gameplay 
The game follows the storylines from the original first three Indiana Jones films: Raiders of the Lost Ark, Temple of Doom and Last Crusade. The game's developers divided the story from the films into six chapters in the game, with each a story and a Freeplay mode as in the traditional Lego gameplay. The story mode must be played first, restricting the player from using preselected characters, from the real scenes in the film, in the game, with the option to use any other (unlocked) character during the Freeplay mode. These characters can then be used to interact with the environment that other characters sometimes cannot do during story mode to gain new items or find new doorways, puzzles or game collectibles.

Barnett College, Dr. Jones' teaching location from Last Crusade (earlier known as "Marshall College" in the predecessors) serves as the main hub of the game, and different maps on the walls allow access to each of the missions, extra unlockable content and options are found in the different classrooms. Once a player chooses a mission, a cutscene begins that introduces the section of the movie being played. Notable scenes have been recreated from the movies, such as the memorable boulder escape, the battle on the rope bridge, or Walter Donovan choosing the incorrect Holy Grail.

There are 82 (standard) playable characters in total, 23 characters that are given to players in the story and 59 characters that may be purchased from the in-game Library. Then, there are the two custom figures which can be made by the players, and the bonus character Han Solo (much like Indiana Jones was a playable character in Lego Star Wars: The Complete Saga). A few other characters can also be played with the "Secret Characters" extra on, only playable on certain levels (such as Santa Claus in "Into the Mountains" or Dancing girl 2 in "Shanghai Showdown"). Each character featured in the game has his/her own unique ability, which is required to access new areas when replaying a level in Free Play mode. Lego Indiana Jones allows players to mix and match parts to customize characters and make their own creations like "Belloq Jones" or "Colonel Toht".

LEGO Indiana Jones also allows players to customize characters and make their own creations. In addition, players can play as their custom creations in the Art Room to test their character's abilities. However, all custom characters have the Whip ability, which may clash with their custom character's appearance.

New features were added to the gameplay from the Lego Star Wars series, such as the ability for the player to interact with objects in their environment, e.g., bottles, swords, and guns. Players can also build and ride vehicles. The game also incorporates character phobias from the films; for example, if Indiana Jones sees a snake, Willie sees a spider or Henry Jones Senior or Elsa see a rat, they will be frozen with fear and have limited movement capacity until the animals are either dead or out of range. Also, new melee attacks, such as the Whip snag (trips enemies), have been added.

Nintendo DS 

The DS version has some significant changes to accommodate both the memory and size limitations of the DS as well as its unique touchscreen controls. Characters' special abilities, such as Indy's whip or Satipo's shovel, and elements such as switches can be controlled by using the touch screen. In addition, the built-in microphone comes into play, allowing the player to physically blow out torches on some levels and inflate rubber rafts to cross water hazards.

There are four classes of characters that can use special access panels to enter hidden areas; these all require the player to match a four-block sequence by solving a mini-puzzle on the touch screen. Scholars can access scroll panels and must flip pages in a book to find the correct blocks. Thuggee uses red skull panels and moves a torch to illuminate the blocks on a darkened screen. Military characters can use the green radio panels and scroll through a set of slot-machine wheels to match the pattern. Brotherhood characters enter the red sword panels and solve a block-switching game. In addition, Marion (and Monkey Man) can transform into a monkey on special red pads to climb to otherwise inaccessible areas and throw bottles of alcohol into flaming trash cans to blow up certain obstacles.

The DS version features cameos by Star Wars characters, including Wicket the Ewok and Luke Skywalker frozen in an ice cave resembling the Wampa's, but unlike the console versions, none of the characters are playable. Also, if the players chase Wicket, they might be able to kill him with one hit. In the final scene of "The Last Crusade", The Grail Knight is first shown as a shadow on the wall, which looks like Darth Vader; when the shadow draws a sword, the blade extends like a Lightsaber. Santa Claus, Strong Man, Castle Knight, and the Clown are the only non-movie characters who are unlockable. There are also no hidden levels or bonus rewards for completing the game at 100%.

Red power bricks remain in the DS version, despite being replaced with red parcels in the console and PSP versions. Also, the characters do not suffer from fear of creatures as they do in the console versions.

Development 
It was initially reported that the game would allow up to four players in co-operative mode, but this later turned out to be a miscommunication. While four characters may be visible on the screen, only two can be controlled by players. On the Nintendo DS, up to eight characters may be in the party, but only two may be visible on the screen. Neither the Xbox 360 version nor the PlayStation 3 version support online play through Xbox Live or the PlayStation Network. The Xbox 360 version is backwards compatible with Xbox One and the Xbox Series X.

The music from the films was used in this game, but also some music was extracted from The Young Indiana Jones Chronicles e.g. "Attack of the Hawkmen" or "Daredevils of the Desert" or "Masks of Evil", etc. They were played in various scenes such as when Indy and Satipo approached the temple in "The Lost Temple", or when Indy, Willie and Short Round were preparing the mine cart in "Escape the Mines" or when Indy finds the true Grail in "Temple of the Grail". The original trilogy soundtrack would be used in Lego Indiana Jones 2: The Adventure Continues.

Reception 

Reviews for the game were generally positive. IGN gave the game an 8/10 for the Nintendo DS, PS2 and the Wii 8.4/10 for the 360 and PS3 and 7.7/10 for the PSP. which is similar to the Lego Star Wars games. X-Play gave it a 4 out of 5, saying that it has everything that a fan of the films could want, but it is not as fun as Lego Star Wars. Official PlayStation Magazine UK gave the game an 8/10, praising the immersive nature of the game, and praising the series' choices of source material. Official Nintendo Magazine gave the game 82%, just about the same as Lego Star Wars, saying it was very similar and not much has improved. Game Revolution gave the game B+, citing that the game, designed by fans of the movie series, provides "addictive game play" with "tons of replay value".

The Nintendo DS version of Lego Indiana Jones was nominated for two DS-specific awards from IGN.com, namely Best Action Game and Best Local Multiplayer Game. The Wii version has also been nominated for multiple Wii-specific awards by IGN, including Best Action Game and Best Local Multiplayer Game.

The game's Xbox 360 version received a "Platinum" sales award from the Entertainment and Leisure Software Publishers Association (ELSPA), indicating sales of at least 300,000 copies in the United Kingdom.

Sequel 
A sequel titled Lego Indiana Jones 2: The Adventure Continues was released. It includes game levels for Indiana Jones and the Kingdom of the Crystal Skull (2008) as well as redesigned levels for the other three movies among other new features.

References

External links 
 

2008 video games
Action-adventure games
Feral Interactive games
Games for Windows certified games
Indiana Jones and the Last Crusade games
Indiana Jones and the Temple of Doom games
Indiana Jones video games
Indiana Jones: The Original Adventures
Nintendo DS games
MacOS games
PlayStation 2 games
PlayStation 3 games
PlayStation Portable games
Raiders of the Lost Ark games
LucasArts games
Traveller's Tales games
Video games scored by David Whittaker
Video games set in Austria
Video games set in Egypt
Video games set in India
Video games set in Nepal
Video games set in New York (state)
Video games set in Peru
Video games set in Shanghai
Video games set in Turkey
Video games set in Utah
Video games set in Venice
Video games with alternative versions
Wii games
Windows games
Xbox 360 games
3D platform games
Spike Video Game Award winners
Video games developed in the United Kingdom
Multiplayer and single-player video games